The 1938 season was the ninth completed season of Finnish Football League Championship, known as the Mestaruussarja.

Overview

The 1938 Mestaruussarja  was contested by 8 teams, with HJK Helsinki winning the championship. Sudet Viipuri were relegated to the second tier which was known as the Suomensarja.

League table

Results

See also
1938 Suomensarja (Tier 2)

Footnotes

References

Mestaruussarja seasons
Fin
Fin
1938 in Finnish football